Andrey Kuznetsov was the defending champion, but lost to finalist Adrian Ungur in the quarterfinals, who lost to Julian Reister in the final.

Seeds

  Andrey Kuznetsov (quarterfinals)
  Jan Hájek (quarterfinals, retired)
  Aljaž Bedene (semifinals, retired)
  Julian Reister (champion)
  Adrian Ungur (final)
  Andrej Martin (first round)
  Stéphane Robert (semifinals)
  Dušan Lajović (second round)

Draw

Finals

Top half

Bottom half

References
 Main Draw
 Qualifying Draw

ATP Challenger Trophy - Singles
2013 Singles